Purgatory is an Armenian mystery drama television series. The series premiered on Armenia Premium on March 6, 2017. The series premiered on Armenia TV on 29 January 2017. The TV show is the most googled Armenian television series. The series takes place in Arinj.

Premise 
The main character of TV series is Krist, who is a rich and successful businessman. One year, he became tired of celebrating New Year the same way every year. He wants something different than previous years. At those times, he gets an offer from a travel agency to celebrate New Year in Dadivank, Azerbaijan (formerly Republic of Artsakh). And that was exactly what he wanted. But neither Krist nor 12 vacationers could not even imagine what awaited them in the Armenian monastery. A happy celebration will turn to a severe trial and all of them will be hopelessly trapped, and finding a way out seems almost impossible.

References

External links

Armenian drama television series
Armenian-language television shows
Armenia TV original programming
2010s Armenian television series
2017 Armenian television series debuts
2018 Armenian television series endings